Łysiec may refer to the following places in Poland:
Łysiec or Łysa Góra, a mountain in central Poland
Łysiec, Silesian Voivodeship, a village in south Poland
Łysiec, Polish name for Lysets, a village in western Ukraine

See also
Łysica